Shiselweni II (sometimes called Mbangweni) is an inkhundla of Eswatini, located in the Shiselweni District.  Its population as of the 2007 census was 20,067.

Populated places in Shiselweni Region